Leominster is a market town in Herefordshire, England, at the confluence of the River Lugg and its tributary the River Kenwater. With a population of 11,700, Leominster is the largest of the five towns (Leominster, Ross-on-Wye, Ledbury, Bromyard and Kington) in the county.

From 1974 to 1996, Leominster was the administrative centre for the former local government district of Leominster.

Toponymy
The town takes its name from the English word minster, meaning a community of clergy and the original Celtic name for the district Leon or Lene, probably in turn from an Old Welsh root lei to flow. The Welsh name for Leominster is Llanllieni, with Llan suggesting a possible Celtic origin to the town's religious community.

Contrary to certain reports, the name has nothing to do with Leofric, an 11th-century Earl of Mercia (most famous for being the miserly husband of Lady Godiva).

History

During the Early Middle Ages, Leominster was home to Æthelmod of Leominster, an English saint known to history mainly through the hagiography of the Secgan Manuscript. He is reputedly buried in Leominster.

During the 8th and 9th Century, Danes (or Vikings) frequently raided the area. In 2015, two individuals (operating without landowner permission), using metal detectors, found a large hoard near Leominster (the Leominster hoard) consisting primarily of Saxon jewellery and silver ingots but also coins; the latter date to around 879 CE. According to a news report, "experts believe it was buried by a Viking during a series of raids", while Wessex was ruled by Alfred the Great and Mercia by Ceolwulf II of Mercia.
 

According to the Anglo-Saxon Chronicle, a raid by Gruffudd ap Llywelyn on Leominster in 1052 resulted in the Battle of Llanllieni, between the Welsh and a combined force of Normans (mercenaries) and English Saxons.

Henry I bestowed the minster and its estates on Reading Abbey, which founded a priory at Leominster in 1121, although there was one here from Saxon times. Its Priory Church of St. Peter and St. Paul, which now serves as the parish church, is the remaining part of this 12th-century Benedictine monastery. Quatrefoil piers were inserted between 1872–79 by Sir George Gilbert Scott.

The priory was ransacked by the Welsh forces of Owain Glyndŵr after their victory at the Battle of Bryn Glas near Pilleth in 1402, along with several local manor houses.

Investigations to the north of the priory in 2005 located the position of the cloister, although most of the stone had been stolen following the Dissolution. Discarded animal bones found on the site when submitted to carbon dating showed that the area was occupied in the 7th century. This agrees with the date of 660 CE associated with the founding myth, which suggests a Christian community was established here by a monk, St. Eadfrith, originally from Lindisfarne in Northumbria.

Leominster is also the historical home of Ryeland sheep, a breed once famed for its "Lemster"  wool, known as 'Lemster ore'. This wool was prized above all other English wool in trade with the continent of Europe in the Middle Ages. It was the income and prosperity from this wool trade that established the town and the minster and attracted the envy of the Welsh and other regions.

From approximately 1748 to 1754, Pinsley Mill in Leominster was home to one of the Paul-Wyatt cotton mills, the first four cotton mills in the world, employing the spinning machines of Lewis Paul and John Wyatt. The mill was financed by Lancashire native Daniel Bourn, and was partly owned by other men from Lancashire.  Bourn introduced his own version of the carding engine to work at this mill, and of the four Paul-Wyatt mills, it may have been the most successful, as shortly after the fire that destroyed the mill, it was reported that the cotton works "had been viewed with great pleasure and admiration by travellers and all who had seen them."

One of the last ordeals by ducking stool took place in Leominster in 1809, with Jenny Pipes as the final incumbent. The ducking stool is on public display in Leominster Priory; a mechanised depiction of it is featured on the town clock.

Climate
As with all towns in England, Leominster has a maritime climate, with mild winters and summers. The data below is from a weather station in Preston Wynne, a village about 10 miles South East of Leominster.

Transport
The  A49 £9 million bypass opened in November 1988. The town also has a bus station linking it to Hereford and a number of nearby towns and villages.

Railways
Leominster railway station is managed by Transport for Wales who provide services on the Welsh Marches Line.

Buses

There are regular buses to Hereford and Ludlow, as well as an infrequent bus service to Ledbury.

Schools
Earl Mortimer college, is a state comprehensive school providing secondary education for about 650 pupils. There is also Leominster Primary School and Westfield's Special School. Primary schools in the villages around the town include Ivington, Kimbolton, Kingsland, Luston and Stoke Prior.

Media 
In print, Leominster is served by the Hereford Times, The Leominster News and the Teme Valley Times. Local radio stations are Sunshine Radio, Sunshine 855, BBC Radio Hereford & Worcester and Free Radio Herefordshire & Worcestershire.

Notable people

 John Ward (24 June 1704 – 30 October 1773) was an English actor and theatre manager. He was the first of the Kemble family theatrical dynasty and the first recorded performer of a Shakespearian play in Stratford-upon-Avon, and is also notable as the author of the two earliest surviving prompt books of Shakespeare's Hamlet, which reveal how the play was performed in eighteenth century England and also throw light on earlier practice. Upon Ward's retirement, Roger Kemble took on his first management position by taking over the management of the theatre at Leominster in 1766. He formed a traveling theatrical company soon after his marriage to Sarah Ward, and subsequently she and their children toured with the company for the next fifteen years. Five of Kemble's children and many of his grandchildren became famous actors. The oldest of their twelve children, Sarah Siddons, became the most famous.

 Saint Cuthfleda was the abbess of Leominster nunnery and the patroness of the region. She was known for her holiness and her chaste life.
 Æthelmod of Leominster Anglo-Saxon Saint
 Leofric, Earl of Mercia and his wife Godgifu Lady Godiva – are commemorated as benefactors of the monastery at Leominster
 John Abel (1578/9-1675), an English carpenter and mason, granted the title of 'King's Carpenter', who was responsible for several notable structures in the ornamented half-timbered construction, notably the market house known as Grange Court (1633) in Leominster, which originally stood in Broad Street, but was rebuilt in 1855 near to the Priory Church. It is widely regarded as one of Abel's finest works.
 John Scarlett Davis (1804–1845), artist, was born at 2 High Street. A number of his works are in Leominster Museum.
 Arthur Peppercorn (1889–1951), locomotive designer
 Jarrod Bowen (1996– ), footballer for West Ham United and the England national team.

Twin towns
Leominster is twinned with Saverne in France, and Tengeru in Tanzania.

Local attractions
Croft Castle
Berrington Hall 
Grange Court, Leominster town centre
Leominster Museum 
Broadfield Court
Burford House Gardens
Priory Church, Leominster
Monkland Cheese dairy
Hampton Court
Stockton Bury Gardens

See also 
Leominster (UK Parliament constituency)

References

External links

Leominster Town Council
Leominster Town Website
Leominster History from Archenfield Archaeology (this site is not available)
 

 
Market towns in Herefordshire
Towns of the Welsh Marches
Towns in Herefordshire
Civil parishes in Herefordshire